José Serrano Salgado (born 19 November 1970) is an Ecuadorian politician. He was President of the National Assembly between 14 May 2017 and 9 March 2018. He was Minister of the Interior from 13 May 2011 to 15 November 2016. He previously held other cabinet posts.

Personal life
José Serrano was born 19 November 1970 in Cuenca, Ecuador. He is a politician with a long career in the public sector. He served as Interior Minister from May 2013 until November 2016, so he was elected to head the list of candidates for the National Congress, being elected as the most voted nationwide with 39% by Alianza-Pais party followed by a right-wing political party CREO with the 15%.

He served as a President of the National Congress of Ecuador from May 2017 until March 2018 after his dismissal by the National Congress, for alleged conspiracy.

During his tenure as Minister of the Interior (2012-2016) the homicide rate in Ecuador fell significantly, from 17.57 cases in 2010 to 6.41 cases in 2015 and closed 2016 with 5 cases per 100,000 inhabitants.

Education
Serrano has a master's degree in Social Intervention in Knowledge Societies from the University of La Rioja, and he has a post-graduate degree in Project Management from the Universidad San Francisco de Quito. José Serrano has doctorate in Jurisprudence and lawyership in Justice Tribunals of the Republic of Ecuador by the University of Azuay.

Political career
Serrano got his first ministerial post under President Alfredo Palacio when he was made Minister of Labour and Employment in June 2005. He kept this position until August 2006. In this period he managed to get a reform of the labour laws through parliament. He managed to do so after triparty negotiations between employees, employers and the parliament. In December 2006 he served a stint as Minister of Finance. Under the new President Correa, Serrano was made Subsecretary of Mines in the Ministry of Mines and Petroleum. He served in this capacity between September 2007 and August 2009. He then served between November 2009 and April 2010 as Secretary of Transparent Management. During his tenure he implemented the Plan Andino, a counter-corruption initiative. He succeeded in working together with Colombia to get this plan through the Andean Community of Nations.

Following this, he was made Minister of Justice, Human Rights and Religious Affairs, serving between April 2010 and May 2011. While serving in this capacity there was some controversy around his decision to try to make the indigenous justice system less powerful. After a case in which a suspect of murder was subjected to indigenous justice, President Correa called this treatment "a monstrosity" and "this is torture, this is barbarity". The Justice Ministry then started drafting legislation to make a list of cases in which indigenous justice could be applicable. Indigenous people said they would not like to have to their system restricted in these kind of cases because they see it as a way to resolve internal conflict. On 13 May 2011, Serrano was designated Minister of the Interior by President Correa. During his tenure there has been a crackdown on organised crime, which has shaken the nation's illegal drugs sector. He is also known for his reformation to the police institution reached the greatest internal purification of all time, devolving the militarized command to a social one based on human rights, providing a dignified life for all the members of the institution.

In November 2013 Serrano temporary took control as Minister of Justice, Human Rights and Religious Affairs after Minister Lenin Lara resigned.

On 15 November 2016 Serrano resigned as Minister of the Interior, to become the lead candidate of the PAIS Alliance in the 2017 Ecuadorian general election. He was succeeded by Diego Fuentes. In February 2014 he won the elections as the most voted National Assembly member. On 14 May 2017 he was elected President of the National Assembly. The National Assembly accused him of a political conspiracy to divide up the different commissions and deal with right-wing parties. The Assembly voted on his abdication on 9 March 2018, resulting in 103 votes in favour and 3 abstentions.

As an activist and protector of human rights he was invited by the Inter-American Court of Human Rights to assume a junior lawyer position.

Decorations
He received the National Order of Merit in the degree of Grand Cross by the Government of Ecuador for his work in reforming the labour laws of Ecuador.

The US Drug Enforcement Agency (DEA) today honored Ecuador's Interior Minister, José Serrano Salgado, in recognition of the results of the counternarcotics fight in the South American country.

The Municipality of the Metropolitan District of Quito has awarded the merit award "María Verónica Cordovez" to the Minister of the Interior, José Serrano Salgado, "for his exceptional services in internal security" for the benefit of the inhabitants of the capital of the Republic.

References

1970 births
Living people
Ecuadorian Ministers of Finance
Government ministers of Ecuador
People from Cuenca, Ecuador
Presidents of the National Assembly (Ecuador)
Universidad San Francisco de Quito alumni